Beijing Capital Airlines, commonly known as Capital Airlines, is a Chinese low-cost airline based in Beijing Daxing International Airport. It is a subsidiary of Hainan Airlines.

History

The company was established in 1995 as Deer Jet Airlines. In 1998, it began offering international services under the Deer Air branding. In October 2007, it received its first Airbus A319 and began returning the formerly operated Boeing 737s. Deer Jet began providing charter services in December 2008 using a fleet of A319s and corporate jets. The airline was authorized by the Civil Aviation Administration of China to operate scheduled air services in 2009.

On 2 April 2010, Beijing Capital Airlines CO., LTD. launched its first service, based in Beijing Capital International Airport. Deer Jet Airlines was divided into two companies on May 4, 2010. While the charter operation has kept the Deer Jet branding, scheduled operations using Airbus aircraft were renamed Beijing Capital Airlines. Beijing Capital Airlines operates mainly in China including the Hong Kong and Macao special administrative regions and Taiwan, focusing on international air passenger service and cargo transport operations.

Destinations
Since 2015, long-haul flights between China and other cities have been operated by Beijing Capital Airlines, with their first A330 delivered on July 11, 2015.

In July 2016 Beijing Capital Airline announced its first launch, an Australian flight from Qingdao to Melbourne on September 30, served by an Airbus A330 jet.

In July 2017 Beijing Capital Airline launched its second Australian nonstop flight from Qingdao to Sydney, served by an Airbus A330.

In November 2016, Beijing Capital Airlines announced the launch of a Hangzhou-Qingdao-Vancouver service on December 30, 2016, which is served by an Airbus A330 aircraft.

Beijing Capital Airlines launched twice a week Beijing-Xian-Lisbon service starting from August 30, 2019.

In September 2019, Beijing Capital Airlines announced that it would be moving some flights from Beijing Capital Airport to the newly opened Beijing Daxing Airport from October 27, 2019.

Fleet

Current fleet

, Beijing Capital Airlines has an all-Airbus fleet consisting of the following aircraft:

Former fleet

Beijing Capital Airlines has previously operated the following aircraft:

 Boeing 737-300
 Boeing 737-700
 6 Airbus A319-100

Focus cities and hubs 
Beijing Daxing International Airport, hub
Qingdao Jiaodong International Airport, hub
Hangzhou Xiaoshan International Airport, hub
Haikou Meilan International Airport
Sanya Phoenix International Airport
Xi'an Xianyang International Airport
Nanjing Lukou International Airport
Hefei Xinqiao International Airport
Zhengzhou Xinzheng International Airport
Shenyang Taoxian International Airport
Shijiazhuang Zhengding International Airport
Guangzhou Baiyun International Airport
Lijiang Sanyi Airport

References

External links

 Official Beijing Capital Airlines website 
 Official Deer Jet website

Airlines of China
Companies based in Beijing
Airlines established in 1995
Chinese brands
Chinese companies established in 1995
HNA Group
Low-cost carriers